District 30 of the Oregon State Senate comprises all of Baker, Grant, Harney, Jefferson, Malheur, and Wheeler counties, as well as parts of Deschutes, Lake, and Wasco counties. It is currently represented by Republican Lynn Findley of Vale. The 30th district is the largest in the state.

Election results
District boundaries have changed over time, therefore, senators before 2013 may not represent the same constituency as today. From 1993 until 2003 and from 2003 until 2013 it covered a slightly different area in eastern Oregon.

References

30
Baker County, Oregon
Deschutes County, Oregon
Grant County, Oregon
Harney County, Oregon
Jefferson County, Oregon
Lake County, Oregon
Malheur County, Oregon
Wheeler County, Oregon
Wasco County, Oregon